Mitlenatch Island Nature Provincial Park is a provincial park in British Columbia, Canada, located on Mitlenatch Island a small islet in the northern Strait of Georgia within the Strathcona Regional District.

History
In 1959, the Province of British Columbia purchased Mitlenatch from a local family and in 1961 it was designated as a Provincial Nature Park. Mitlenatch is a First Nations word with a number of meanings. In Coast Salish it has been translated to mean ‘calm waters all around’. Perhaps the most descriptive meaning comes from the Sliammon language where ‘metl’ meant calm and ‘nach’ meant posterior. Calm (waters) behind is an apt description of the island during stormy weather. In the Kwak'wala language of the Kwakwaka'wakw, ‘mah-kwee-lay-lah’ meant "it looks close, but seems to move away as you approach it".

Conservation
Mitlenatch Island Nature Provincial Park is home to the largest seabird colony in the Strait of Georgia. Glaucous-winged gulls, pelagic cormorants, pigeon guillemots, rhinoceros auklets and black oystercatchers also return to Mitlenatch each spring to breed. All sedentary marine life, including abalones, scallops and sea cucumbers are fully protected within this zone. Some of the largest garter snakes in BC reside here. These snakes are frequently encountered along trails and in beach and tide pool areas, where they feed on small fish such as sculpins and blennies. This park is a favourite haul out for harbour seals, northern and California sea lions. The sea lions are generally present from late autumn to mid-May. River otters, killer whales and harbour porpoises are often sighted offshore.

Recreation
The following recreational activities are available: canoeing and kayaking around the island and nature watching. Due to the sensitive bird habitat, most of the island is closed to the public. A short trail from Camp Bay to Northwest Bay, and to East Hill gull  blind are the only areas accessible to visitors.

Location
Located 30 kilometers northeast of Courtenay, British Columbia in the Strait of Georgia.

Size
The island is 35.5 ha in area and the park boundaries include surrounding waters for a total of 155 hectares in size.

See also
List of British Columbia Provincial Parks
List of Canadian provincial parks

References 

 2018. Butler, R.W. Early bird records from Mitlenatch Island, B.C. British Columbia Birds 28: 10-20.

External links
Mitlenatch Island Nature Provincial Park

Provincial Parks of the Gulf Islands
Provincial parks of British Columbia
Islands of British Columbia
1961 establishments in British Columbia
Protected areas established in 1961